Giant is a 2009 comedy film, written and directed by Adrían Biniez, an Argentinian film director living in Uruguay.

Synopsis
Jara (Horacio Camandule) is a security guard at a supermarket who falls in love with Julia (Leonor Svarcas), a cleaning worker on the night shift. Jara is about 30 years old, solitary, quiet and big. That is why before approaching Julia, he watches her via the television cameras monitoring the supermarket, and then pursues her across the city of Montevideo, where the film is set.

Cast
 Horacio Camandule as  Jara
 Leonor Svarcas as Julia 
 Diego Artucio as Omar 
 Ariel Caldarelli as Jara's boss 
 Fabiana Charlo as Mariela 
 Andrés Gallo as Fidel
 Federico García as Matías 
 Néstor Guzzini as Tomás
 Esteban Lago as Gustavo
 Ernesto Liotti as Danilo
 Carlos Lissardy as Kennedy

Awards and nominations

Film Awards

Submissions
 Berlin Film Festival
 Golden Bear (nominated)
 Goya Awards
 Best Spanish Language Foreign Film (nominated)

See also
 List of films featuring surveillance

References

External links
 
 
 

2009 comedy-drama films
2009 films
Films set in Montevideo
Films scored by Harald Kloser
Films shot in Montevideo
Silver Bear Grand Jury Prize winners
Uruguayan comedy-drama films